The Drummond, later Williams-Drummond Baronetcy, of Hawthornden in the County of Mid Lothian, was a title in the Baronetage of the United Kingdom. It was created on 27 February 1828 for John Forbes Drummond. In accordance with the special reminder, the baronetcy passed to his son-in-law Francis Walker, who had assumed the additional name of Drummond upon his marriage in 1810. The third Baronet assumed the surname of Williams in lieu of that of Walker in 1858 under the terms of the will of his father-in-law, Sir James Hamlyn-Williams, 3rd Baronet 'of Clovelly'. The fourth Baronet served as Lord Lieutenant of Carmarthenshire. The title became extinct on the death of the sixth Baronet in 1976.

Drummond, later Williams-Drummond baronets, of Hawthornden (1828)
Sir John Forbes Drummond, 1st Baronet (died 1829), Sir James William
Sir Francis Walker Drummond, 2nd Baronet WS FRSE (1781–1844)
Sir James Williams-Drummond, 3rd Baronet (1814–1866)
Sir James Hamlyn Williams Williams-Drummond, 4th Baronet (1857–1913)
Sir James Hamlyn Williams Williams-Drummond, 5th Baronet (1891–1970)
Sir William Hugh Dudley Williams-Drummond, 6th Baronet (1901–1976)

See also
Drummond baronets
Hamlyn-Williams baronets
Williams baronets

References

Williams-Drummond
Williams-Drummond